Blood Orange is a 1953 British crime film directed by Terence Fisher and starring Tom Conway and Mila Parély. It was released in the United States as Three Stops to Murder. A private eye investigating a jewel robbery at a London fashion house finds himself involved in a murder mystery. The film is one of a handful of thrillers that Fisher made for Hammer Film Productions before he directed many of their early horror films in the late 1950s.

Cast
 Tom Conway as Tom Conway
 Mila Parély as Helen Pascall
 Naomi Chance as Gina
 Eric Pohlmann as Mr Mercedes
 Andrew Osborn as Captain Colin Simpson
 Richard Wattis as Detective Inspector MacLeod
 Margaret Halstan as Lady Marchant
 Eileen Way as Mme Fernande
 Michael Ripper as Eddie
 Betty Cooper as Miss Betty
 Thomas Heathcote as Detective Sergeant Jessup
 Alan Rolfe as Inspector
 Roger Delgado as Marlowe
 Reed DeRoven as Heath
 Delphi Lawrence as Chelsea
 Ann Hanslip as Jane

Critical reception
Sky Movies gave the film two out of five stars, and wrote: "This one is smartly styled but shorter than a mini-skirt when it comes to thrills."

References

External links

1953 films
1953 crime films
British crime films
British black-and-white films
Films directed by Terence Fisher
British detective films
Hammer Film Productions films
1950s English-language films
1950s British films